Koshto (English: The Pain, Bengali: কষ্ট) is a 2000 Bangladeshi film starring Manna, Moushumi and Dipjol. Moushumi garnered a Bachsas Award for Best Actress for her performance in the film.

Soundtrack 

All music composed by Ahmed Imtiaz Bulbul and lyrics also penned by himself.

Awards 
Bachsas Awards
 Best Actress 2000 – Moushumi
 Best Supporting Actor 2000 – Dipjol
 Best Female Playback Singer 2000 – Konok Chapa

References

Further reading

External links
 

2000 films
Bengali-language Bangladeshi films
Films scored by Ahmed Imtiaz Bulbul
2000s Bengali-language films